Mylapra is a village in Pathanamthitta district in the Indian state of Kerala.
It comes under the Mylapra Panchayath. It is on the way to the famous Hindu pilgrim center of Sabarimala. The Main Eastern Highway (Punalur–Pathanamthitta–Muvattupuzha Road/SH-08) passes through Mylapra.

Etymology
The word mylapra is derived from two Malayalam words myle (a peacock) and appuram (the other side). It is believed that a hunter used a sword to kill a peacock but the peacock escaped narrowly and fell on one side and the sword hit the other. This was the birth of the names of two places, viz Mylapra and Vettipuram. "Myle (peacock) appuram (that side), Vett (cut) ipuram (this side). The side where the peacock fell is named Mylapra; the side where the sword fell is Vettipuram."

Demographics
 India census, Mylapra had a population of 10241 with 4836 males and 5405 females.

Religious places

Temples 
Mylapra Devi Temple
Devi temple, Kumbazha North
NSS Karayogam, Mylapra
SNDP Kumbazha North Temple

Churches 
St. George Orthodox Church, Mylapra
Sacred Heart Malankara Catholic Church, Mylapra
Salem Mar Thoma Syrian Church, Mylapra
Jerusalem Marthoma Church, Valliyanthy
Palamoodu Mar Kuriakose Orthodox Church, Kumbazha North
Salem Brethren Assembly, Mylapra.
St. Thomas Orthodox Chapel Mannapuzha.
St. Mary's Catholic Church Marygiri, Kattadi.
St. Thomas Malankara Catholic Church, Valliyanthy.
Indian Pentecostal Church Valliyanthy.
St. Marks CSI Church, Mylapra.
Orthodox Chappal, Valliyanthy.

Ashram 
Bethany Ashram, Mylapra
 Mar Kuriakose Orthodox Dayara, Kumbazha North

Education

Schools
Mount Bethany English Higher Secondary School, Mylapra
Sacred Heart Higher Secondary School, Mylapra (Kerala Board)
N.M.L.P School, Mylapra (Kerala Board)
Government L.P School, Mylapra (Kerala Board)
M.S.C.L.P. School, Valliyanthy.
SNV UP School, Kumpazhavadakku

Teacher Training Institute
 Sacred Heart Teachers Training College, Mylapra

Industrial Training Institute
 Mar Philoxenos ITI, Mylapra

Function hall
 St. George Auditorium, Mylapra
 Sam's Auditorium
 Jerusalem Marthoma Auditorium, Valliyanthy

Banking
 State Bank of Travancore
 South Indian Bank
 Mylapra Service Co Operative Bank
 Kumbazha North Service Co Operative Bank
 Federal Bank

Shopping Area
 Amrutha Farmers Super Market

Industries
 Myfood Roller Flour Factory

References

Villages in Pathanamthitta district